Dilermando Reis (full name "Dilermando dos Santos Reis") (September 22, 1916 – January 2, 1977) was a Brazilian musician, composer, guitarist and music teacher.

He once had Juscelino Kubitschek's (the former Brazilian president) daughter as a student. Other students included Bola Sete, Nicanor Teixeira, Darcy Vila Verde and many others.

He left 23 LPs as a soloist (often with unattributed accompaniment from Meira, or later Dino Sete Cordas) and seven accompanying the singer Francisco Petronio. David Russell has performed his works on guitar. Raphael Rabello recorded an entire CD of his work.

References

External links
 

1916 births
1977 deaths
20th-century composers
20th-century guitarists
20th-century male musicians
Brazilian classical composers
Brazilian classical guitarists
Brazilian male guitarists
Choro musicians
Columbia Records artists
Brazilian music educators
People from Guaratinguetá